The 2016–17 UMass Lowell River Hawks women's basketball team represented the University of Massachusetts Lowell during the 2016–17 NCAA Division I women's basketball season. The River Hawks were led by second year head coach Jenerrie Harris and once again played most their home games in the Costello Athletic Center while select games were  played in the Tsongas Center at UMass Lowell as members of the America East Conference.

UMass Lowell was in the fourth and final year of a transition to Division I and thus ineligible for the postseason, including the America East tournament.

They finished the season 3–26, 0–16 in America East play to finish in last place.

Media
All non-televised home games and conference road games will stream on either ESPN3 or AmericaEast.tv. Most road games will stream on the opponents website.

Roster

Schedule

|-
!colspan=9 style=| Non-conference regular season

|-
!colspan=9 style=| America East regular Season

See also
 2016–17 UMass Lowell River Hawks men's basketball team

References

UMass Lowell River Hawks women's basketball seasons
UMass Lowell
UMass Lowell River Hawks women's basketball
UMass Lowell River Hawks women's basketball